Pontianak Malay  (Bahase Melayu Pontianak, Indonesian: Bahasa Pontianak, Jawi script: بهاس ملايو ڤونتيناك) is a Malayan language spoken in Pontianak, Indonesia and the surrounding area. 

It is one of the two major varieties of Malayic languages spoken in West Kalimantan, the other being Sambas Malay. Pontianak Malay is a close relative of Sambas as well as Sarawak Malay in neighbouring Sarawak, Malaysia. Elements from Johor-Riau Malay, Chinese, Banjarese, Indonesian, various Dayak languages as well as many localism can be seen in the language, reflecting the various ethnic origins residing in the city.

Although Pontianak is relatively homogeneous, some regional sub-dialects are notable. The Malay varieties spoken in Pontianak, Kubu Raya, Ketapang and Mempawah differ slightly from each other. Differences exist both in terms of vocabulary and phonology.

Linguistic features 

The pronunciation system in Pontianak Malay language stressed the usage of the /ə/, this is closely resembles Johor-Riau variant compared to the other Bornean Malay dialects and the related standard Indonesian language. Another notable feature of the accent is the Voiced velar fricative in pronouncing the letter R which similarly used in Sarawakian Malay. In addition, the spoken interjection of Bah is widely used in Pontianak , corresponding to the usage of language observed throughout coastal Borneo.

Languages of Indonesia
Malay dialects

Malayic languages